Syria competed at the 2020 Summer Olympics in Tokyo. Originally scheduled to take place from 24 July to 9 August 2020, the Games were postponed to 23 July to 8 August 2021, because of the COVID-19 pandemic. It was the nation's fourteenth appearance at the Summer Olympics since its debut in 1948.

The Syrian Olympic Committee sent a team of six athletes, five men and one woman, to compete in six different sports at the Games, matching the nation's roster size with Athens 2004. Thanks to Man Asaad, Syria won its first Olympic medal since the 2004 Olympics.

Medalists

Competitors
The following is the list of number of competitors in the Games.

Athletics

One Syrian athlete achieved the entry, by qualifying by world ranking, in the following track and field events:

Field events

Equestrian

Syria entered one jumping rider into the Olympic competition by finishing in the top two, outside the group selection, of the individual FEI Olympic Rankings for Group F (Africa & Middle East), marking the country's recurrence to the sport after an eight-year absence.

Jumping

Swimming

Syria received a universality invitation from FINA to send one top-ranked swimmers in their respective individual events to the Olympics, based on the FINA Points System of June 28, 2021.

Table tennis
 
Syria entered one athlete into the table tennis competition. 11-year-old Hend Zaza secured a berth in the women's singles with a gold medal victory at the 2020 West Asia Olympic Qualification Tournament in Amman, Jordan. She was the youngest competitor in any sport in the 2020 Olympics.

Triathlon

Syria entered one triathlete to compete at the Games after received the tripartite commission quotas.

Weightlifting

Syrian weightlifters qualified for one quota place at the games, based on the Tokyo 2020 Rankings Qualification List of 11 June 2021.

References

Nations at the 2020 Summer Olympics
2020
2020 in Syrian sport